Coleosporium pacificum is a fungal plant pathogen.

References

Pucciniales
Fungal plant pathogens and diseases
Fungi described in 1977